Jocelyn Blanchard (born 28 May 1972) is a French former professional footballer who played as a midfielder.

Career
Blanchard was born in Béthune, Pas-de-Calais.

While at Metz he played in the final as they won the 1995–96 Coupe de la Ligue.

On 5 June 2009, Austria Kärnten signed Blanchard from Austria Wien until June 2010. He was released by Austria Kärnten after the club went into liquidation in 2010.

Style of play
Blanchard was an accurate passer of the ball and possessed excellent technique. He  earned a reputation as a key player for his teams, and his main attributes were his tough tackling and stamina.

References

External links
 

1972 births
Living people
People from Béthune
Sportspeople from Pas-de-Calais
Association football midfielders
French footballers
French expatriate footballers
USL Dunkerque players
FC Metz players
RC Lens players
Juventus F.C. players
FK Austria Wien players
SK Austria Kärnten players
Ligue 1 players
Serie A players
Austrian Football Bundesliga players
French expatriate sportspeople in Italy
French expatriate sportspeople in Austria
Expatriate footballers in Italy
Expatriate footballers in Austria
Footballers from Hauts-de-France